Neocalamobius clavatus is a species of beetle in the family Cerambycidae, and the only species in the genus Neocalamobius. It was described by Breuning in 1943.

References

Agapanthiini
Beetles described in 1943
Monotypic beetle genera